Nicola Di Bari (born 29 September 1940) is an Italian singer-songwriter and actor. He is considered one of the "sacred monsters" of Italian pop music.

Life and career 
Born in Zapponeta, Apulia, Di Bari was the youngest of ten children from a farming family. He gave up his accountancy studies to work in Rome, and after a short stay in Rome he moved to Milan. In 1962, in Cologno Monzese, he won a song contest with a song of which he was also the author, "Piano pianino". In 1964 he achieved his first commercial success with the song "Amore ritorna a casa". Between 1965 and 1967 he entered the competition at three editions of the Sanremo Music Festival, while coupled with Gene Pitney.

In 1970 Di Bari obtained even greater commercial and critical success with the song "La prima cosa bella", which ranked second at the Sanremo Music Festival and first on the Italian hit charts. In 1971 he won the Sanremo Music Festival and Canzonissima, with the songs "Il cuore è uno zingaro" and "Chitarra suona più piano". In 1972, he again won the Sanremo Festival and represented Italy at the Eurovision Song Contest with the song "I giorni dell'arcobaleno" ("The Days of the Rainbow"). In the following years Di Bari grew his international popularity, especially in Latin America, where he recorded several albums in Spanish and where he gradually focused his career.

Selected discography

Albums 
1965 Nicola Di Bari (Jolly records, LPJ 5041)
1970 Nicola Di Bari (RCA, PSL 10464)
1971 Nicola Di Bari (RCA, PSL 10494)
1971 Nicola di Bari canta Luigi Tenco (RCA, PSL 10520)
1972 I giorni dell'arcobaleno (RCA, PSL 10533)
1973 Paese (RCA, PSL 10571)
1973 Un altro Sud (RCA, DPSL 10597)
1973 La colomba di carta (RCA, TPL1-1043)
1974 Ti fa bella l'amore (RCA, TPL1-1104)
1977 Nicola Di Bari (Carosello, CLN 25068)
1981 Passo dopo passo (WEA, T 58327)
1982 L'amore è... (Carosello, CLN 25096)
1985 Innamorarsi (CBS, 57047)
1987 Encanto (CBS DIL, 11350)

Singles 

1963 "Piano... pianino.../Perché te ne vai" (Jolly, J 20217)
1964 "Amore ritorna a casa/Senza motivo" (Jolly, J 20229)
1964 "Non farmi piangere più/Ti tendo le braccia" (Jolly, J 20255)
1965 "Tu non potrai capire/Una cosa di nessuna importanza" (Jolly, J 20280)
1965 "Amici miei/Amo te, solo te" (Jolly, J 20282)
1965 "Piangerò/Il rimpianto" (Jolly, J 20294)
1965 "Un amore vero/Non sai come ti amo" (Jolly, J 20331)
1966 "Lei mi aspetta/Ridi con me" (Jolly, J 20346)
1967 "Guardati alle spalle/Judy" (Jolly, J 20406)
1968 "Se mai ti parlassero di me/Giramondo" (RCA, PM 3416)
1968 "Il mondo è grigio, il mondo è blu/Solo ciao" (RCA, PM 3448)
1969 "Eternamente/La vita e l'amore" (RCA, PM 3488)
1970 "La prima cosa bella/...e lavorare" (RCA, PM 3510)
1970 "Vagabondo/La mia donna" (RCA, PM 3531)
1970 "Una ragazzina come te/Zapponeta" (RCA, PM 3554)
1971 "Il cuore è uno zingaro/Agnese" (RCA, PM 3575)
1971 "Anima/Pioverà pioverà" (RCA, Pl 1)
1971 "Un uomo molte cose non le sa/Sogno di primavera" (RCA, PM 3611)
1971 "Chitarra suona più piano/Lontano, lontano" (RCA, PM 3627)
1972 "I giorni dell'arcobaleno/Era di primavera" (RCA, PM 3639)
1972 "Occhi chiari/Un minuto... una vita" (RCA, PM 3673)
1972 "Paese/Qualche cosa di più" (RCA, PM 3693)
1974 "Sai che bevo, sai che fumo/Libertà" (RCA, TPBO 1121)
1975 "Beniamino/Tema di Beniamino" (RCA, TPBO 1150)
1976 "La più bella del mondo/Anna, perché"  (Carosello, Cl 20415)
1976 "E ti amavo/Momento" (Carosello, Cl 20435)
1977 "Lei, mia/Favole" (Carosello, Cl 20450)
1979 "Chiara/Partire perché" (VIP, 10205)
1982 "Innamorati noi/Solamente una vez" (Carosello, Cl 20510)
1983 "Vorrei/Sono triste" (Polydor, 815 409-7)

CDs 
1995 Il meglio di Nicola Di Bari ("The Best of Nicola di Bari"), (DV More Records, DV 5874)
1999 I più grandi successi ("The Greatest Hits"), (Duck Records)

Selected filmography

Actor 
 I ragazzi dell'Hully Gully ("The kids of hully gully"), directed by Marcello Giannini (1964)
 Questi pazzi, pazzi italiani ("These crazy, crazy Italians"), dir. by Tullio Piacentini (1965)
 Viale della canzone ("Song Avenue"), dir. by Tullio Piacentini (1965)
 Altissima pressione ("Ultimate pressure"), dir. by Enzo Trapani (1965)
 L'immensità (La ragazza del Paip's) ("Immensity – The girl of the Paip's"), dir. by Oscar De Fina 1967
 The Most Beautiful Couple in the World (1968)
 La ragazza del prete ("The girl of the preacher man"), dir. by Domenico Paolella 1970
 Torino nera ("Black Turin"), dir. by Carlo Lizzani (1972)

Soundtrack composer 
 Preparati la bara! ("You'd Better Smile"), dir. Ferdinando Baldi by (1968)
 Torino nera ("Black Turin"), dir. by Carlo Lizzani (1972)

References

External links

Detailed discography
 Official website
 Fans' webpage dedicated to Nicola di Bari (in Italian)

 

1940 births
Living people
People from the Province of Foggia
Italian pop singers
Italian male singers
Eurovision Song Contest entrants for Italy
Eurovision Song Contest entrants of 1972
Sanremo Music Festival winners
Italian male film actors
Spanish-language singers of Italy